Corker is an occupational surname. Notable people with the surname include:

Bob Corker, American politician
Matt Corker
Thomas Corker
Stephen A. Corker
James Corker
John Corker, American football player
Maurus Corker
Yusuf Corker (born 1998), American football player

Occupational surnames
English-language occupational surnames